General elections were held in Islamabad Capital Territory on Monday
5 February 1997 to elect 1 member of National Assembly of Pakistan from Islamabad.

Pakistan Muslim League (N) won Islamabad seat by the margin of 37,653 votes.

Candidates 
Total no of 5 Candidates including 1 Independent contested for 1 National Assembly Seat from Islamabad. Legend Cricketer and Future Prime Minister Imran Khan also contested from Islamabad for the very first time.

Result 

Party Wise

Constituency wise

References 

1997 elections in Pakistan
General elections in Pakistan